Constantine Garrievich Orbelian, Jr. (born San Francisco, 27 August 1956) is an American conductor and pianist of Armenian and Russian descent. He is named after his paternal uncle Konstantin Orbelyan, a major Armenian composer. Constantine Orbelian is currently Music Director and Principal Conductor of the New York City Opera.

Biography
Born in San Francisco to Russian and Armenian émigré parents, Orbelian Orbelian made his debut as a piano prodigy with the San Francisco Symphony at the age of 11. After graduating from The Juilliard School in New York, he embarked on a career as a concert pianist appearing with major symphony orchestras throughout the U.S., U.K., Europe, and the Soviet Union. His recording of the Khachaturian piano concerto with conductor Neeme Järvi won "Best Concerto Recording of the Year" award in the United Kingdom. He was also a guest conductor for the American Russian Young Artists Orchestra.

Orbelian's appointment in 1991 as Music Director of the Moscow Chamber Orchestra was a breakthrough event: he is the first American ever to become music director of an ensemble in Russia. He was later the Music Director of the Philharmonia of Russia and is the founder of the annual Palaces of St. Petersburg International Music Festival. Orbelian has been chief conductor of the Kaunas City Symphony Orchestra in Lithuania since 2014, and in 2016 he also became General and Artistic Director of the State Academic Opera and Ballet Theater in Yerevan, Armenia. His appointment in June 2021 to the leadership posts at New York City Opera is a landmark in efforts to revive the company’s performance profile.

A tireless champion of Russian-American cultural exchange and international ambassadorship through his worldwide tours, Orbelian was awarded the coveted title "Honored Artist of Russia" in 2004, a title never before bestowed on a non-Russian citizen. In May 2010, Orbelian led the opening Ceremonial Concert for the Cultural Olympics in Sochi — the first event setting the stage for Russia's hosting of the Olympic Games in 2014. In 2012 the Consulate in San Francisco awarded him the Russian Order of Friendship Medal, whose illustrious ranks include pianist Van Cliburn and conductor Riccardo Muti, and which singles out non-Russians whose work contributes to the betterment of international relations with the Russian Federation and its people.

From his 1995 performance at the 50th Anniversary Celebrations of the United Nations in San Francisco to his 2004 performance at the U.S. State Department commemorating 70 years of diplomatic relations between Washington and Moscow, and a repeat State Department appearance in 2007, all with the Moscow Chamber Orchestra, Orbelian continues to use his artistic eminence in the cause of international goodwill. He and his orchestras have also participated in cultural enrichment programs for young people in Russia and the U.S. In 2001 Orbelian was awarded the Ellis Island Medal of Honor, an award given to immigrants, or children of immigrants, who have made outstanding contributions to the United States He was awarded the Order of Friendship of Armenia in 2015.

Discography
Orbelian has an extensive discography, including more than 60 releases for Delos Productions. Orbelian's début recording was  Khatchaturian's Piano Concerto, with the  Scottish National Orchestra under  Neeme Järvi (1987, Chandos CHAN 8542) . A politically and artistically significant recording was Where Are You, My Brothers? — new arrangements of songs from the World War II-era performed by Dmitry Hvorostovsky and the Moscow Chamber Orchestra, and presented in front of an audience of 6,000 at the Kremlin Palace in Moscow in the spring of 2003. The telecast was seen on Russian Television by over 90 million viewers. The same program was performed with the St. Petersburg Symphony Orchestra for survivors of the Siege of Leningrad on January 16, 2004. Orbelian’s collaborations with Hvorostovsky also included recordings of sentimental songs in Moscow Nights and Wait for Me, and Verdi's Simon Boccanegra. Orbelian’s 2014 recording Virtuoso Rossini Arias with tenor Lawrence Brownlee was nominated for a Classical Solo Vocal Album GRAMMY® Award and a 2015 Vocal Recital International Classical Music Awards alongside his recording of Power Players with baritone Ildar Abdrazakov. Orbelian has also received GRAMMY® nominations for Hvorostovsky’s recording of Georgy Sviridov’s vocal cycle Russia Cast Adrift, Hvorostovsky’s Rigoletto and Stephen Costello’s album of bel canto arias, A te o Cara.

Videography
 Renée Fleming and Dmitri Hvorostovsky A Musical Odyssey in St Petersburg / State Hermitage Orchestra, Constantine Orbelian / Decca
Anna Netrebko and Dmitri Hvorostovsky LIVE FROM RED SQUARE MOSCOW / State Academic Symphony Orchestra
 "Evgeny Svetlanov", Conducted by Constantine Orbelian / Deutsche Grammophon
 Hvorostovsky in Moscow / Sondra Radvanovksy and Dmitri Hvorostovsky, Constantine Orbelian, Philharmonia of Russia / Delos Productions
 To Russia With Love/ Dmitri Hvorostovsky, Constantine Orbelian, Moscow Chamber Orchestra, and Style of Five Folk Ensemble/ Delos Productions
 Russian Songs from the War Years / Dmitri Hvorostovsky, Moscow Chamber Orchestra, and Constantine Orbelian / Vai Music

References

External links
Orbelyan

1956 births
Living people
American people of Armenian descent
American people of Russian descent
American male conductors (music)
American classical pianists
Male classical pianists
American male pianists
Armenian conductors (music)
Armenian classical pianists
Armenian pianists
20th-century American pianists
20th-century American conductors (music)
21st-century American conductors (music)
21st-century classical pianists
20th-century American male musicians
21st-century American male musicians
21st-century American pianists